A cheta (/ ), in plural chetas, was an armed band organized by the mostly Bulgarian, Serbian, Albanian, Greek, Aromanian and Megleno-Romanian population on the territory of the Ottoman Empire that undertook anti-Ottoman activity. The cheta was usually led by a leader, called voivoda. The members of the chetas were called chetniks.

In the late Ottoman Empire, armed rebellions became a chronic feature of life in geographic Macedonia as armed groups of pro-Bulgarian, as well as pro-Serbian, pro-Greek, Aromanian and Albanian formations fought against each other as well as the Ottoman troops, trying to impose their nationality on the territory's inhabitants, and increasingly harsh Ottoman crackdowns indicated that reform and reconciliation of the Ottoman state with the various nationalist groups was growing less likely.

See also 

 Albanian revolutionary organizations
 Hajduk
 Chetniks
 Serbian nationalism
 Supreme Macedonian-Adrianople Committee
 Macedonian Struggle
 Guerrilla warfare

References 

Guerrilla organizations
History of the Balkans
Rebels from the Ottoman Empire
Macedonian Struggle